Mulberry Township is a township in Ellsworth County, Kansas, USA.  As of the 2000 census, its population was 44.

Geography
According to the USGS, it contains one cemetery, Mulberry.

The stream of Table Rock Creek runs through this township.

Transportation
Mulberry Township contains one airport or landing strip, Belcher Airport.

References
 USGS Geographic Names Information System (GNIS)

External links
 US-Counties.com
 City-Data.com

Townships in Ellsworth County, Kansas
Townships in Kansas